Gaylord Ravenal is the leading male character in Edna Ferber's 1926 novel Show Boat, in the famous Jerome Kern-Oscar Hammerstein II 1927 musical play of the same name based on the novel, and in the films made from it. He is a  handsome, compulsive riverboat gambler, and he becomes leading man of the show boat Cotton Blossom at the same time that Magnolia Hawks, the captain's daughter, becomes the leading lady. In the novel, this happens after several of the company's leading men and ladies have left, including the illegally married mulatto Julie Dozier (to whom Magnolia was especially close) and her white husband Steve Baker. In the musical, Magnolia and Ravenal become the leading players on the boat immediately after Julie and Steve are forced to leave the show, not years later.

In the musical, Magnolia and Ravenal meet in the first scene of the show, and before Julie and Steve ever leave (this was done by Kern and Hammerstein in order to bring Ravenal into the story much earlier). In the novel the two meet right after Ravenal is hired as leading man, and long after Julie and Steve have left.

Character history
Magnolia and Gaylord fall in love and marry after a whirlwind courtship, and here again the novel and the musical differ. 

In the novel, they stay on the boat until shortly after the accidental drowning of Cap'n Andy during a storm. Because of the incessant nagging of Magnolia's mother, Parthy, they leave the boat with their baby daughter and move to Chicago, where they live off Gaylord's gambling earnings. They are alternately rich and poor, and Gaylord is occasionally unfaithful to his wife and belittles her. Years later, upon hearing that Parthy is coming to visit, and finding himself broke, he borrows money from the local whorehouse madam and returns, completely drunk, to the boarding house at which they are living. As he sleeps, Magnolia goes to the whorehouse to return the money, is horrified and saddened to discover that her old friend Julie is working as a secretary there, and comes back to the boarding house to discover that Ravenal has abandoned her (Magnolia). He never returns, and Magnolia brings up their daughter alone. Ravenal eventually dies under unexplained circumstances, in San Francisco. Years later, after Parthy dies, Magnolia returns to Mississippi to manage the show boat and gives her daughter all of Parthy's inheritance money.

In the musical, Gaylord Ravenal is a much more sympathetic character. None of the characters in the story die in the musical, and Gaylord remains faithful to Magnolia. The pair moves to Chicago with their daughter, as in the novel, but not because of Parthy's nagging. Rather, Gaylord wants to show Magnolia the big city. He deserts her after ten years, not because he fears the wrath of Parthy, but because he feels guilty over his gambling losses and his inability to support Magnolia. She gets a job as a nightclub singer (this is made possible by Julie, who, now an alcoholic, secretly quits her job so that Magnolia can have it). Magnolia then goes on to become a Broadway star, with the encouragement of her father, Cap'n Andy, all the while raising her daughter alone. Twenty-three years later, when Magnolia retires and she and her now adult daughter (now a Broadway star herself) return to the boat for a family reunion, Gaylord is there waiting. He and Magnolia reconcile, and all is well.

Portrayals
Gaylord Ravenal was portrayed by Howard Marsh in the original 1927 stage production of Show Boat. However, when producer Florenz Ziegfeld brought most of the original cast back in his 1932 revival of the show, Marsh was replaced by noted actor-singer Dennis King. In 1929, Joseph Schildkraut, complete with Viennese accent, was rather incongruously cast as a non-singing Ravenal in the first, part-talkie film version of Show Boat. In James Whale's 1936 film version, which many consider to be a movie musical classic, Allan Jones played the role. In the 1946 stage revival, a version revised to accommodate a slightly shorter running time by Kern and Hammerstein themselves, Charles Fredericks, a featured actor in B-Westerns who also had an excellent singing voice, took on the role. In MGM's 1951 highly popular Technicolor remake of the musical, Howard Keel portrayed Ravenal.

The 1946 highly fictionalized biopic of Jerome Kern's life, Till the Clouds Roll By featured a re-enactment of some of the first act of Show Boat, with singer-actor Tony Martin as Ravenal.

In popular culture
In the Season 3 episode of M*A*S*H, entitled "Payday", Hawkeye Pierce (Alan Alda) refers to Trapper John McIntyre (Wayne Rogers) as "Ravenal" during a poker game while arguing about a large pot Trapper accumulated after borrowing Hawkeye's watch.

In the Season 4 episode of M*A*S*H, entitled "Der Tag", Pierce sarcastically refers to Frank Burns (Larry Linville) as "Mr. Ravenal" during a poker game, after Frank admits to being inexperienced at gambling.

Ravenal, Gaylord
Ravenal, Gaylord
Ravenal, Gaylord